Xanadu Records was a jazz record label founded in 1975 by Don Schlitten. It was most active during the 1970s and 1980s and stopped recording in the 1990s. The catalogue was bought by emusic in 1999, but no new music was produced. In 2007, the catalogue was bought by The Orchard, which entered an agreement in 2015 with Elemental Music to reissue some of the catalog as the Xanadu Master Edition Series. The partnership planned to include albums by Kenny Barron, Bob Berg, Al Cohn, Sonny Criss, Joe Farrell, Barry Harris, Dexter Gordon, Albert Heath, Jimmy Heath, Duke Jordan, Charles McPherson, and Cecil Payne.

Discography

References

Defunct record labels of the United States
Jazz record labels